The Ponnambalam–Coomaraswamy family is a Sri Lankan Tamil Hindu family that was prominent in politics in former British Ceylon and later Sri Lanka from the colonial era to 1972. Many members received imperial honours such as knighthood by the British Crown.

History 
The Ponnambalam–Coomaraswamy family are mainly from Manipay, Jaffna and were of the Sri Lankan Vellalar caste. They have been politically active since 18th century, with many having posts such as Mudaliyars, a title for Ceylonese officials used under the Colony governments of Ceylon.

Arumuganathapillai Coomaraswamy, one of the earliest known member of the family was a Gate Mudaliyar, second highest Mudaliyar position. Arumuganathapillai rendered service to the British under the Kandyan Wars, in their attempt to gain control over the Kandy Kingdom.

The family have also made noteworthy contributions. Ponnambalam Ramanathan founded the Parameshwara College, which was later used by Sri Lankan government to establish the University of Jaffna. Sri Ponnambalam Vaneswarar Temple located in Colombo is also credited to be founded by the family. Sri Kurinji Easware temple is a temple located in Kodaikanal, Tamil Nadu is credited to have been built by a European woman, Leelawathy Ramanathan, the wife of Ponnambalam Ramanathan.

Furthermore, have some of the family members contributed to literature. Ananda Coomaraswamy was a metaphysician and aesthetician, who widely contributed to bringing Indian art to the Western world and has contributed with many books on traditional Indian and Sinhalese art.

Notable members of the family

 Arumugampillai Coomaraswamy (1783-1836), Gate Mudaliyar, Member of Legislative Council
 Sir Muthu Coomaraswamy CCS FRGS (1833-1879), Member of Legislative Council + Elizabeth Clay Beebe
 Ananda Coomaraswamy (1877-1947)
 Narada Coomaraswamy 
 Sellachchi Coomaraswamy + Arunachalam Ponnambalam (1814-1887), Mudaliyar of the Governor's Gate
 P. Coomaraswamy (1849-1906), Member of Legislative Council
 Sir Ponnambalam Ramanathan KCMG QC (1851-1930), Solicitor General of British Ceylon, Member of Legislative Council + Leelawathy Ramanathan (1870-1953)
 Sivagamasundari + S. Natesan, Member of Parliament, Member of State Council, Senator
 Sir Ponnambalam Arunachalam KCMG CCS (1853-1924), Member of Executive Council, Member of Legislative Council + Swarnambal Namasivayam
 Arunachalam Padmanabha
 Sir Arunachalam Mahadeva KCMG (1888-1969), Government Minister, Member of Legislative Council, Member of State Council, High Commissioner to India
 Balakumar Baku Mahadeva
 Kumar Mahadeva
 Arunachalam Ramanathan
 Pathmavathy Arunachalam + Sir S. Pararajasingam, Senator
 Pararajasingham Nadesan
 Lalithambikai (-2005) + M. Swaminathan
 D. M. Swaminathan (1945-), Member of Parliament, Governor of Western Province

See also 
 List of political families in Sri Lanka

References